Christopher Laurence Broadby (born 17 March 1959) was an Australian cricket player, who played for the Tasmanian Tigers. He was a right-handed batsman and left-arm orthodox bowler who represented Tasmania from 1979 until 1988.

See also
 List of Tasmanian representative cricketers

External links
Cricinfo Profile

1959 births
Living people
Australian cricketers
Tasmania cricketers
Cricketers from Hobart